Knardrup Abbey was the last medieval Cistercian foundation in Denmark. It was situated to the north-west of Copenhagen between Ganløse and Måløv.

History
The monastery was founded shortly before 1326 by King Christopher II on the royal estate of Knardrupsgård as a daughter house of Sorø Abbey and settled in February 1326 by monks from Sorø. The abbey remained in existence until 1536 when it was secularised as a crown estate and given to the University of Copenhagen. The building materials were later used for the construction of Frederiksborg Castle.

The abbey site is now partly built over, and there are no visible remains of the monastery.

References
Christensen, Villads, 1914: Knardrup Klosters Historie, pp. 72–99. Frederiksborg Amt

Sources and external links
Knardrup Kloster 
Cistercienserordenen 

Cistercian monasteries in Denmark
1326 establishments in Europe
Monasteries dissolved under the Danish Reformation